Akshay Luciano Bacheta (born 26 April 1990 in Romford, England) is a British professional racecar driver, born to Indian parents with Italian ancestry.

Career

Bacheta started karting at the age of fourteen in 2004 and stepped up to cars in 2005, racing in the Junior Ginetta series, recording six wins and the most fastest laps and pole positions. In 2006, Bacheta won the T Cars Championship after scoring six consecutive victories mid-season, and edged out Max Chilton by three points. In the off-season, Bacheta moved into open-wheel racing, competing in the Formula Palmer Audi Autumn Trophy. At Snetterton, Bacheta won his very first race in a single-seater car, and went on to finish the Autumn Trophy in third place after problems at round two.

Bacheta committed to racing a full campaign in Formula Palmer Audi for the 2007 season, and finished third overall in the championship standings with three poles and four wins. He competed in the Autumn Trophy again at the completion of the season, but could only finish a lowly fourteenth in the standings.

Bacheta moved into Formula Renault in 2008, moving into both the Eurocup and the West European Cup, driving for the Hitech Junior Team. Bacheta made six starts in the WEC, recording a best finish of ninth at Magny-Cours with left him 26th in the championship. He fared three places better in the pan-European series, amassing three points from an eighth-place finish at Le Mans. Bacheta moved to Epsilon Sport for the 2009 campaigns, but put his main emphasis into the Eurocup, with just one appearance in the WEC – finishing fifth and sixth – at the World Touring Car Championship-supporting round in Pau. In the Eurocup, Bacheta finished in the points three times, en route to sixteenth in the championship, despite missing the rounds in Hungary with budgetary problems. He has returned to the series in 2010, with the new Interwetten Junior Team, finishing as vice-champion. He was also awarded BRDC Rising Star status and nominated for the McLaren Autosport BRDC Award.

Racing record

 As Bacheta was a guest driver, he was ineligible to score points.

Complete GP3 Series results
(key) (Races in bold indicate pole position) (Races in italics indicate fastest lap)

Complete FIA Formula Two Championship results
(key) (Races in bold indicate pole position) (Races in italics indicate fastest lap)

Complete Auto GP results
(key) (Races in bold indicate pole position) (Races in italics indicate fastest lap)

Complete European Le Mans Series results

750 Motor Club
After some years away from competing, Luciano Bacheta returned to racing at the 750MC Birkett 6 Hour Relay in 2019 and won aboard a Radical SR3, with team-mates Wade Eastwood and Charles Graham.

References

External links

 
 

1990 births
Living people
People from Brentwood, Essex
English people of Spanish descent
English racing drivers
Formula Palmer Audi drivers
Formula Renault Eurocup drivers
Formula Renault 2.0 WEC drivers
GP3 Series drivers
FIA Formula Two Championship drivers
Formula Renault 2.0 NEC drivers
Auto GP drivers
MRF Challenge Formula 2000 Championship drivers
Ginetta Junior Championship drivers
Greaves Motorsport drivers
European Le Mans Series drivers
Mücke Motorsport drivers
DAMS drivers
GT4 European Series drivers